"Mille" is a song by Italian singers Fedez, Achille Lauro and Orietta Berti. It was written by Davide "d.whale" Simonetta, Paolo Antonacci, Dargen D'Amico, Achille Lauro and Fedez and produced by Simonetta.

It was released by Warner Music Italy and Sony Music on 11 June 2021. "Mille" peaked at number one on the Italian FIMI Singles Chart and was certified platinum in Italy two weeks after its release.

Background
The song was born following a collaboration decided by the three artists during the Sanremo Music Festival 2021 and was announced by the three artists through an Instagram live on the evening of 12 June 2021. The cover of the single, created by Francesco Vezzoli, shows the three artists in the form of nymphs covered with flowers.

Commercial performance
"Mille" debuted at number one on the FIMI Singles Chart, becoming Fedez's tenth number one, Lauro's first and Berti's first since 1965.

Music video
The music video for the song was released on YouTube on 14 June 2021. It was directed by Giulio Rosati.

Track listing

Charts

Weekly charts

Year-end charts

Certifications

References

2021 singles
2021 songs
Achille Lauro (singer) songs
Fedez songs
Number-one singles in Italy
Songs written by Davide Simonetta